Lynn Curtis Swann (born March 7, 1952) is an American former football player, broadcaster, politician, and athletic director, best known for his association with the University of Southern California and the Pittsburgh Steelers. He served on the President's Council on Fitness, Sports, and Nutrition from 2002 to 2005. In 2006, he was the Republican nominee for Governor of Pennsylvania.

Swann was born in Alcoa, Tennessee. He attended USC and played football as a wide receiver of the USC Trojans, where he was a consensus All-American. He is regarded as one of the most popular and one of the greatest wide receivers of his generation. He was drafted by the Steelers in the first round of the 1974 NFL Draft. With the Steelers, Swann won four Super Bowls, was selected to three Pro Bowls, and was named MVP of Super Bowl X. Swann was inducted into the Pro Football Hall of Fame in 2001 and the College Football Hall of Fame in 1993.

Early life
Swann was born March 7, 1952, in Alcoa, Tennessee, in the foothills of the Great Smoky Mountains near Knoxville.

The Swann family moved to San Mateo, California, in the San Francisco Bay Area when Lynn was 2.  As a youth, Swann was raised in neighboring Foster City and attended Junípero Serra High School, where in addition to playing football, he was a track star, leaping  in the long jump. At the 1970 CIF California State championship meet, Swann won the state title, defeating future Olympic gold medalist Randy Williams.

College career
Swann attended the University of Southern California in Los Angeles, where he was an consensus All-American on the Trojan football team under head coach John McKay, including the undefeated and national champion 1972 team. McKay said of Swann, "He has speed, soft hands, and grace." He completed a Bachelor of Arts Degree in public relations in 1974.

In 1971, Swann had 27 catches for 305 yards and two touchdowns. He led USC in catches and finished second to WR Edesel Garrison in receiving yards. As a junior in 1972, Swann rushed for 117 yards and had 27 catches for 543 yards and three touchdowns. This time, he led USC in receiving yards and finished second to tight end Charle Young in catches. In 1973, Swann rushed for 99 yards while catching 42 passes for 714 yards and six touchdowns.

Professional career

Swann was selected in the first round of the 1974 NFL Draft by the Pittsburgh Steelers with the 21st overall pick. The Steelers draft class of '74 is considered one of the best in NFL history and includes four Hall of Famers: Swann, Jack Lambert (RD2), John Stallworth (RD4), and Mike Webster (RD5). Undrafted 1974 free agent signee Donnie Shell is also a hall of famer.

Swann spent his entire NFL career with the Steelers and wore the jersey number 88. As a rookie in 1974, he led the NFL with 577 punt-return yards, a franchise record and the fourth-most in NFL history at the time. He went on to win a championship ring with the Steelers in Super Bowl IX, but did not record any receptions in the tough defensive struggle (Pittsburgh quarterback Terry Bradshaw completed only nine passes in the game). However, he returned three punts for 34 yards.

The following season became the highlight of Swann's career. He caught 49 passes for 781 yards and a league-leading 11 touchdowns. In the AFC title game against the Oakland Raiders, George Atkinson knocked Swann out of the game with a very hard but legal hit. He suffered a severe concussion that forced him to spend two days in a hospital, but surprised many by returning to play for Super Bowl X. Swann recorded four catches for a Super Bowl-record 161 yards and a touchdown in the game, assisting the Steelers to a 21–17 win over the Dallas Cowboys and became the first wide receiver to earn Super Bowl MVP honors.

Three seasons later, in 1978, the Steelers made it to Super Bowl XIII. In the game, Swann caught seven passes for 124 yards and scored the final touchdown for Pittsburgh in their 35–31 win over Dallas. 

The Steelers made it back to the Super Bowl again in the 1979 season, and Swann caught five passes for 79 yards and a touchdown at the Rose Bowl in Pittsburgh's 31–19 win over the Los Angeles Rams in Super Bowl XIV. Overall, Swann gained 364 receiving yards and 398 all-purpose yards in his four Super Bowls, which were both Super Bowl records at the time.

Swann retired after the 1982 season with four Super Bowl rings. In his nine-year career, he amassed 336 career receptions for 5,462 yards and 51 touchdowns, 72 rushing yards on 11 attempts and a touchdown, and 739 punt return yards and a touchdown. He was a Pro Bowl selection three times (1975, 1977, 1978), and was selected to the 1970s All-Decade Team.

Swann was unique among football players in that he credited his experiences in dance earlier in life with contributing to his aptitude on the football field. A 1981 interview which aired on Mr. Rogers' Neighborhood showed him on the field, and then in the Pittsburgh dance studio where he later underwrote scholarships.

NFL statistics

After football

Swann went on to serve as a director on the boards of H J Heinz Co., Hershey Entertainment and Resorts, and Wyndham International. He was a football and sports broadcaster for ABC Sports from 1976 to 2006, but left to run for Pennsylvania governor.

Swann briefly hosted the television game show To Tell the Truth, on which he had previously appeared as a panelist before replacing original host Gordon Elliott, on NBC from 1990 to 1991. His 14-week run as emcee ended, and he was replaced by Alex Trebek. He made guest appearances on Mister Rogers' Neighborhood, where he explained his enthusiasm for ballet, and The Paper Chase.

During his time at ABC, Lynn Swann began his broadcasting career in 1976 while still active with the Pittsburgh Steelers. Upon retirement in January 1983, Swann began his career full-time with ABC Sports, which ended after the 2006 Sugar Bowl. Swann has broadcast a variety of events as a host, reporter, and analyst. Included in these events are: 
 the 1976 Winter Olympics
 the 1976 Summer Olympics
 the 1980 Winter Olympics
 the 1984 Winter Olympics
 the 1984 Summer Olympics
 the 1988 Winter Olympics
 the Iditarod Trail sled dog race
 International Diving Championships
 USFL
 college football
 Monday Night Football
 the Kentucky Derby
 Preakness Stakes
 Belmont Stakes
 the Irish Derby
 ABC's Wide World of Sports
 Curt Gowdy's The American Sportsman

Swann was the sideline reporter on CBS' "Clash of Champions" bowling telecast that aired on May 10–11, 2008. He teamed with color analyst Nelson Burton Jr. and play-by-play man Bill Macatee. The broadcast marked bowling's return to network television for the first time since 1999 when CBS carried it.

In October 2009, Swann joined the Augusta National Golf Club. He is a dues-paying member of the home of the Masters golf tournament, which is held every April.

On August 19, 2010, the Pittsburgh Tribune-Review reported that Swann would be a part of the ownership team for Pittsburgh's AFL expansion franchise, which began playing in the spring of 2011. Named the Pittsburgh Power, the team shared the Consol Energy Center with the Pittsburgh Penguins of the National Hockey League. Swann has said that, despite his football experience, he does not interfere in the day-to-day coaching, although he would occasionally give some advice. The team folded in 2014.

Swann made an appearance, playing himself, in the role of a sideline reporter at the "Bourbon Bowl", in the 1998 Adam Sandler comedy feature film The Waterboy. He was inducted into the Rose Bowl Hall of Fame on December 30, 2013, at the Pasadena Convention Center.

On April 13, 2016, Swann was named as the athletic director of the University of Southern California, succeeding retiring Pat Haden. He assumed the position on July 1, 2016.  On September 9, 2019, Swann resigned as the USC AD.

Political career

Physical Fitness and Sports Council chairman

On June 20, 2002, President George W. Bush appointed Swann as the chairman of the United States President's Council on Physical Fitness and Sports during a Fitness Expo at the White House. Swann succeeded Lee Haney, who had been appointed to the post by President Clinton.

In 2003, President Bush and Chairman Lynn Swann launched presidentschallenge.org at the Lakewest Family YMCA in Dallas, Texas. Within the next year, 300,000 individuals registered on the website. Swann spoke at the National Press Club about the council's programs to help Americans "Be Physically Active Every Day," and introduced the Presidential Active Lifestyle Award.

In 2004, Swann and President Bush declared May as an annual "National Physical Fitness and Sports" month, and created the annual HealthierUS Fitness Festival. They also enacted the Healthier Feds Physical Activity Challenge initiative for federal employees. On July 30, 2005, Lynn Swann retired as council chairman to explore a campaign for governor. He was succeeded by John P. Burke.

2006 candidacy for governor

In December 2004, Swann, who resides in the Pittsburgh suburb of Sewickley Heights, Pennsylvania, indicated that he was considering seeking the Republican nomination for Governor of Pennsylvania in the 2006 election. On February 23, 2005, Swann filed papers with the state elections board stating his intention to run. On the same day, he formed a fundraising committee called Team 88 after his Steeler jersey number. On January 4, 2006, Swann formally declared his candidacy.

Swann's opponents for the Republican primary had initially included Jim Panyard, State Senator Jeff Piccola, and former Lieutenant Governor William Scranton, III. After Swann received the endorsement of the Republican state committee on February 11, 2006, all three opponents quit the race, leaving Swann as the only Republican to have filed by the deadline of March 7, 2006. Swann chose Montgomery County Commissioner Jim Matthews as his running mate.

Polls in early February showed Swann and Rendell in a statistical tie, though Rendell had the advantage of being the popular incumbent. Swann's campaign focused on reforming Harrisburg by addressing mass transit, property tax, law enforcement, the environment and the growing concern of obesity. He also supported giving the Pittsburgh Penguins Pittsburgh's lone slots license so they could build a new arena, free of taxpayer money.

Swann's momentum did not survive a barrage of advertising from Rendell in early spring and had trouble keeping up with Rendell's effective fundraising. In the end, Swann lost the election with 40% of the vote to incumbent Ed Rendell's 60%. Had Swann won, he would have been the first African American Governor of Pennsylvania and only the third African American elected governor of a state in U.S. history. Of the three Republican African American gubernatorial candidates in 2006, all three of them lost; Kenneth Blackwell lost in Ohio, and Randy Daniels lost in New York.

2008 to present

In 2008, Swann confirmed that he was considering running for the United States House of Representatives from Pennsylvania's 4th congressional district against Rep. Jason Altmire. However, Swann did not file for the election and former congresswoman Melissa Hart won the Republican nomination unopposed and then lost to Altmire in the 2008 general election.

In the 2008 presidential election, Swann endorsed and campaigned with Arizona Senator John McCain for the presidency, though Swann had remained neutral through the primaries. In 2012, he did the same for former Massachusetts Governor Mitt Romney, once Romney had become the presumptive Republican nominee.

In 2015, before the primary elections, Swann announced his support of former Florida Governor Jeb Bush, while also criticizing Donald Trump.

Personal life
On June 10, 1979, during the summer after winning Super Bowl XIII, Swann married Bernadette Robi, the daughter of singer Paul Robi of The Platters. The pair divorced in 1983.

On June 23, 1991, Swann married Charena (née Shaffer), a psychologist, and they have two sons who played football collegiately.

Swann is a member of Groove Phi Groove Social Fellowship.

See also
 Bay Area Sports Hall of Fame
 Drew Crompton

References

External links

 
 
 
 
 
 

|-

|-

1952 births
Living people
21st-century American politicians
African-American Christians
African-American college athletic directors in the United States
African-American game show hosts
African-American male track and field athletes
African-American people in Pennsylvania politics
African-American players of American football
All-American college football players
American athlete-politicians
American Conference Pro Bowl players
American football wide receivers
American game show hosts
American horse racing announcers
American television reporters and correspondents
American television sports announcers
ArenaBowl broadcasters
Arena football announcers
Arena Football League executives
Bowling broadcasters
Christians from California
Christians from Pennsylvania
Christians from Tennessee
College football announcers
College Football Hall of Fame inductees
Junípero Serra High School (San Mateo, California) alumni
National Football League announcers
Olympic Games broadcasters
Pennsylvania Republicans
People from Alcoa, Tennessee
People from Foster City, California
People from San Mateo, California
Pittsburgh Steelers players
Players of American football from California
Players of American football from Pittsburgh
Players of American football from Tennessee
Politicians from Pittsburgh
Pro Football Hall of Fame inductees
Sportspeople from Pittsburgh
Sportspeople from the San Francisco Bay Area
Super Bowl MVPs
Track and field athletes from California
Track and field athletes from Pennsylvania
Track and field athletes from Tennessee
United States Football League announcers
USC Trojans athletic directors
USC Trojans football players
Black conservatism in the United States